Superior orders, also known as the Nuremberg defense or just following orders, is a plea in a court of law that a person, whether a member of the military, law enforcement, a firefighting force, or the civilian population, should not be considered guilty of committing actions that were ordered by a superior officer or official. 
 
The superior orders plea is often regarded as the complement to command responsibility.

One of the most noted uses of this plea, or defense, was by the accused in the 1945–1946 Nuremberg trials, such that it is also called the "Nuremberg defense". The Nuremberg trials were a series of military tribunals, held by the main victorious Allies after World War II, most notable for the prosecution of prominent members of the political, military, and economic leadership of the defeated Nazi Germany. These trials, under the London Charter of the International Military Tribunal that established them, determined that the defense of superior orders was no longer enough to escape punishment, but merely enough to lessen punishment.

Apart from the specific plea of superior orders, discussions about how the general concept of superior orders ought to be used, or ought not to be used, have taken place in various arguments, rulings and statutes that have not necessarily been part of "after the fact" war crimes trials, strictly speaking. Nevertheless, these discussions and related events help to explain the evolution of the specific plea of superior orders and the history of its usage.

Historically, the plea of superior orders has been used both before and after the Nuremberg Trials, with inconsistent rulings, up to the final ruling of International Criminal Court in the Prosecutor v Ntaganda case.

History

Before 1500

In 1474, in the trial of Peter von Hagenbach by an ad hoc tribunal of the Holy Roman Empire, the first known "international" recognition of commanders' obligations to act lawfully occurred. Hagenbach offered the defense that he was just following orders, but this defense was rejected and he was convicted of war crimes and beheaded.

Specifically, Hagenbach was put on trial for atrocities committed under his command but not by him directly, during the occupation of Breisach. This was the earliest modern European example of the doctrine of command responsibility. Since he was convicted for crimes "he as a knight was deemed to have a duty to prevent", Hagenbach defended himself by arguing that he was only following orders from the Duke of Burgundy, Charles the Bold, to whom the Holy Roman Empire had given Breisach.

1900–1947

Court-martial of Breaker Morant

During the Second Boer War, three Australian officers (Morant, Handcock and Witton) were charged and tried for a number of murders, including those of prisoners who had surrendered. A significant part of the defense was that they were acting under orders issued by Lord Kitchener to "take no prisoners". However, these orders were verbal, were denied by Kitchener and his staff, and could not be validated in court, resulting in a guilty verdict against all three men.

German military trials after World War I

On June 4, 1921, the legal doctrine of superior orders was used during the German Military Trials that took place after World War I: one of the most famous of these trials was the matter of Lieutenant Karl Neumann, who was a U-boat captain responsible for the sinking of the hospital ship the Dover Castle. Even though he frankly admitted to having sunk the ship, he stated that he had done so on the basis of orders supplied to him by the German Admiralty and so he could not be held liable for his actions. The Reichsgericht, then Germany's supreme court, acquitted him, accepting the defense of superior orders as a grounds to escape criminal liability. Further, the court stated "... that all civilized nations recognize the principle that a subordinate is covered by the orders of his superiors."

Many accused of war crimes were acquitted on a similar defense, creating immense dissatisfaction among the Allies. This is thought to be one of the main causes for the specific removal of this defense in the August 8, 1945 London Charter of the International Military Tribunal. The removal has been attributed to the actions of Robert H. Jackson, a Justice of the United States Supreme Court, who was appointed Chief Prosecutor at the Nuremberg trials.

On the other hand, when the defendants could not reasonably claim that they did not know their orders were clearly illegal, the defense was ineffective. For instance, Lieutenants Dithmar and Boldt were ordered to fire on lifeboats, obeyed the order, and were found guilty in the same German Military Trials. However, their sentence was overturned on appeal.

Dostler case

On October 8, 1945, Anton Dostler was the first German general to be tried for war crimes by a US military tribunal at the Royal Palace of Caserta. He was accused of ordering the execution of 15 captured US soldiers of Operation Ginny II in Italy in March 1944. He admitted to ordering the execution but said that he could not be held responsible because he was following orders from his superiors. The execution of the prisoners of war in Italy, ordered by Dostler, was an implementation of Adolf Hitler's Commando Order of 1942, which required the immediate execution of all Allied commandos, whether they were in proper uniforms or not, without trial if they were apprehended by German forces. The tribunal rejected the defense of Superior Orders and found Dostler guilty of war crimes. He was sentenced to death and executed by a firing squad on December 1, 1945, in Aversa.

The Dostler case became a precedent for the principle that was used in the Nuremberg Trials of German generals, officials, and Nazi leaders beginning in November 1945: using superior orders as a defense does not relieve officers from responsibility of carrying out illegal orders and their liability to be punished in court. The principle was codified in Principle IV of the Nuremberg Principles, and similar principles are in the 1948 Universal Declaration of Human Rights.

Nuremberg Trials after World War II

In 1945 and 1946, during the Nuremberg trials the issue of superior orders again arose. Before the end of World War II, the Allies suspected such a defense might be employed and issued the London Charter of the International Military Tribunal (IMT), which explicitly stated that following an unlawful order is not a valid defense against charges of war crimes.

Thus, under Nuremberg Principle IV, "defense of superior orders" is not a defense for war crimes, although it might be a mitigating factor that could influence a sentencing authority to lessen the penalty. Nuremberg Principle IV states:

The fact that a person acted pursuant to order of his Government or of a superior does not relieve him from responsibility under international law, provided a moral choice was in fact possible to him.

During the Nuremberg Trials, Wilhelm Keitel, Alfred Jodl, and other defendants unsuccessfully used the defense. They contended that while they knew Hitler's orders were unlawful, or at least had reason to believe they were unlawful, their place was not to question, but to obey. They claimed they were compelled to do so by the Führerprinzip (leader principle) that governed the Nazi regime, as well as their own oath of allegiance to Hitler. In most cases, the tribunal found that the defendants' offenses were so egregious that obedience to superior orders could not be considered a mitigating factor.

Before the trials, there was little Allied consensus about prosecuting Nazi war prisoners. Winston Churchill was inclined to have the leaders 'executed as outlaws'. The Soviets desired trials but wished there to be a presumption of guilt.

The German military law since 1872 said that while the superior is ("solely") responsible for his order, the subordinate is to be punished for his participation in it if he either transgressed the order on his own account, or if he knew the order to be criminal. The Nazis did not bother (or were too reluctant) to formalize many of their offenses (e.g., killing a non-combatant without trial), so the prosecutors at Nuremberg could have argued that the defendants broke German law to begin with. However, this line of argument was infrequently used.

"Nuremberg defense"

The trials gained so much attention that the "superior orders defense" has subsequently become interchangeable with the label "Nuremberg defense", a legal defense that essentially states that defendants were "only following orders" ("Befehl ist Befehl", literally "an order is an order") and so are not responsible for their crimes.

However, US General Telford Taylor, who had served as Chief Counsel for the United States during the Nuremberg trials, employed the term "Nuremberg defense" in a different sense. He applied it not to the defense offered by the Nuremberg defendants but to a justification put forward by those who refused to take part in military action (specifically America's involvement in the Vietnam War) that they believed to be criminal.

1947–2000

The defense of superior orders again arose in the 1961 trial of Nazi war criminal Adolf Eichmann in Israel, as well as the trial of Alfredo Astiz of Argentina, who was responsible for many disappearances and kidnappings that took place during its last civil-military dictatorship (1976–1983). The dictators forced state-sponsored terrorism upon the population, resulting in what (to several sources) amounted to  genocide.

The 1950s and 1960s saw the defense of Befehlsnotstand, a concept in which a certain action is ordered which violates law but where the refusal to carry it out would lead to drastic consequences for the person refusing. This was quite successful in war crimes trials in Germany. With the formation of the Central Office of the State Justice Administrations for the Investigation of National Socialist Crimes this changed, as its research revealed that refusing an unlawful order did not result in punishment.

Israeli law since 1956
In 1957, the Israeli legal system established the concept of a 'blatantly illegal order' to explain when a military (or security-related) order should be followed, and when it must not be followed. The concept was explained in 1957 in the Kafr Qasim massacre ruling. The trial considered for the first time the issue of when Israeli security personnel are required to disobey illegal orders. The judges decided that soldiers do not have the obligation to examine each and every order in detail as to its legality, nor were they entitled to disobey orders merely on a subjective feeling that they might be illegal. On the other hand, some orders were manifestly illegal, and these must be disobeyed. Judge Benjamin Halevy's words, still much-quoted today, were that "The distinguishing mark of a manifestly illegal order is that above such an order should fly, like a black flag, a warning saying: 'Prohibited!'  Illegality that pierces the eye and revolts the heart, if the eye is not blind and the heart is not impenetrable or corrupt."

Captain (res.) Itai Haviv, a signatory of the 'courage to refuse' letter of 2002 tells of his unhappiness about his service for the Israeli Defense Forces (IDF) and says "For 35 years a black flag was proudly hanging over our heads, but we have refused to see it". A translation note explains the "Black Flag" principle but adds "In the 45 years that passed since [the ruling], not even a single soldier was protected by a military court for refusing to obey a command because it was a 'black flag' command."

1968 Mỹ Lai massacre 
Following the Mỹ Lai massacre in 1968, the defense was employed during the court martial of William Calley. Some have argued that the outcome of the Mỹ Lai trial was a reversal of the laws of war that were set forth in the Nuremberg and Tokyo War Crimes Tribunals. Secretary of the Army Howard Callaway was quoted in the New York Times as stating that Calley's sentence was reduced because Calley believed that what he did was a part of his orders. Calley used the exact phrase "just following orders" when another American soldier, Hugh Thompson, confronted him about the ongoing massacre.

In United States v. Keenan, the accused was found guilty of murder after he obeyed an order to shoot and kill an elderly Vietnamese citizen. The Court of Military Appeals held that "the justification for acts done pursuant to orders does not exist if the order was of such a nature that a man of ordinary sense and understanding would know it to be illegal". The soldier who gave the order, Corporal Luczko, was acquitted by reason of insanity.

1998 Rome Statute of the International Criminal Court

The Rome Statute was agreed in 1998 as the foundation document of the International Criminal Court, established to try those accused of serious international crimes. Article 33, titled "Superior orders and prescription of law", states:

2000–present

Legal proceedings of Jeremy Hinzman in Canada

Nuremberg Principle IV, and its reference to an individual's responsibility, was at issue in Canada in the case of Hinzman v. Canada. Jeremy Hinzman was a U.S. Army deserter who claimed refugee status in Canada as a conscientious objector, one of many Iraq War resisters. Hinzman's lawyer, (at that time Jeffry House), had previously raised the issue of the legality of the Iraq War as having a bearing on their case. The Federal Court ruling was released on March 31, 2006, and denied the refugee status claim. In the decision, Justice Anne L. Mactavish addressed the issue of personal responsibility:
An individual must be involved at the policy-making level to be culpable for a crime against peace ... the ordinary foot soldier is not expected to make his or her own personal assessment as to the legality of a conflict. Similarly, such an individual cannot be held criminally responsible for fighting in support of an illegal war, assuming that his or her personal war-time conduct is otherwise proper.Hinzman v. Canada Federal Court decision. Paras (157) and (158). Accessed 2008-06-18

On November 15, 2007, a quorum of the Supreme Court of Canada made of Justices Michel Bastarache, Rosalie Abella, and Louise Charron refused an application to have the Court hear the case on appeal, without giving reasons.

Legal proceedings of Ehren Watada in the United States

In June 2006, during the Iraq War, Ehren Watada refused to go to Iraq on account of his belief that the war was a crime against peace (waging a war of aggression for territorial aggrandizement), which he believed could make him liable for prosecution under the command responsibility doctrine. In this case, the judge ruled that soldiers, in general, are not responsible for determining whether the order to go to war is itself a lawful order – but are only responsible for those orders resulting in a specific application of military force, such as shooting civilians or treating POWs inconsistently with the Geneva Conventions. This is consistent with the Nuremberg defense, as only the civilian and military principals of the Axis were charged with crimes against peace, while subordinate military officials were not. It is often the case in modern warfare that while subordinate military officials are not held liable for their actions, neither are their superiors, as was the case with Calley's immediate superior Captain Ernest Medina.

Based on this principle, international law developed the concept of individual criminal liability for war crimes, which resulted in the current doctrine of command responsibility.

Legal proceedings of Vadim Shishimarin in Ukraine
On February 28, 2022, during the 2022 Russian invasion of Ukraine, Russian Sergeant Vadim Shishimarin shot and killed unarmed civilian Oleksandr Shelipov, a 62 year old Ukrainian man. His trial started on 13 May 2022, and on Wednesday 18 May, Shishimarin pleaded guilty to the killing. On Friday 20 May, Shishimarin's defense lawyer asked for his client to be acquitted of war crimes. He argued that Shishimarin had intended not to kill but only to carry out the order formally, which Shishimarin had refused twice before succumbing to pressure from other soldiers. He further argued that the shots were unaimed, fired from a moving vehicle with a faulty tire, and only one bullet out of the burst hit. Ukrainian officials say that they have registered upwards of 10,000 warcrimes across the country, and this trial is only the first of many to soon follow.

Summary

Note: Yellow rows indicate the use of the precise plea of Superior Orders in a war crimes trial - as opposed to events regarding the general concept of Superior Orders.

Arguments

The superior orders defense is still used with the following rationale in the following scenario: An "order" may come from one's superior at the level of national law. But according to Nuremberg Principle IV, such an order is sometimes "unlawful" according to international law. Such an "unlawful order" presents a legal dilemma from which there is no legal escape: On one hand, a person who refuses such an unlawful order faces the possibility of legal punishment at the national level. On the other hand, a person who accepts such an unlawful order faces the possibility of legal punishment at the international level.

Nuremberg Principle II responds to that dilemma by stating: "The fact that internal law does not impose a penalty for an act which constitutes a crime under international law does not relieve the person who committed the act from responsibility under international law."

This might present a legal dilemma, but Nuremberg Principle IV speaks of "a moral choice" as being just as important as legal decisions: "The fact that a person acted pursuant to order of his Government or of a superior does not relieve him from responsibility under international law, provided a moral choice was in fact possible to him".

In moral choices or ethical dilemmas a decision is often made by appealing to a "higher ethic". One found in many religions and in secular ethics is the ethic of reciprocity, or Golden Rule. It states that one has a right to just treatment, and therefore has a reciprocal responsibility to ensure justice for others.

Although messengers are not usually responsible for the content of messages, the Babylonian Talmud (3rd to 5th century corpus of Jewish law) states, "There is no messenger in a case of sin." Joseph Telushkin interprets the precept to mean that "if a person is sent to perform an evil act, he cannot defend his behavior by saying he was only acting as another's messenger.  ... [T]he person who carries out the evil act bears responsibility for the evil he or she does." This is because God's law (i.e. morality) supersedes human law.

Another argument against the use of the superior orders defense is that it does not follow the traditional legal definitions and categories established under criminal law, where a principal is any actor who is primarily responsible for a criminal offense. Such an actor is distinguished from others who may also be subject to criminal liability as accomplices, accessories or conspirators. (See also the various degrees of liability: absolute liability, strict liability, and mens rea.)

The common argument is that every individual under orders should be bound by law to immediately relieve of command an officer who gives an obviously unlawful order to their troops. This represents a rational check against organizational command hierarchies.

Nuremberg Principle IV, the international law that counters the superior orders defense, is legally supported by the jurisprudence found in certain articles in the Universal Declaration of Human Rights that deal indirectly with conscientious objection. It is also supported by the principles found in paragraph 171 of the Handbook on Procedures and Criteria for Determining Refugee Status, which was issued by the Office of the United Nations High Commissioner for Refugees (UNHCR). Those principles deal with the conditions under which conscientious objectors can apply for refugee status in another country if they face persecution in their own for refusing to participate in an illegal war.

Bibliography 
 Yoram Dinstein: The Defence of Obedience to Superior Orders in International Law, Sijthoff-Leyden, 1965.
 Paola Gaeta: The Defence of Superior Orders: The Statute of the International Criminal Court versus Customary International Law, pdf, European Journal of International Law, 1999.
 Matthew Lippman: Conundrums of Armed Conflict: Criminal Defenses to Violations of the Humanitarian Law of War pdf, Penn State International Law Review, 1996, Volume 15.

See also
 Anton Dostler
 Command responsibility
 Führerprinzip
 International legal theory
 Laws of war
 Milgram experiment
 Nuremberg Principle IV
 Nuremberg Principles
 Peter von Hagenbach
 Radbruch formula
 Respondeat superior
 Rule of Law in Armed Conflicts Project
 Sources of international law
 Tu quoque defense
 Vicarious liability

References

External links
usmilitary.about.com: To Obey or Not to Obey

United States military law
International criminal law
Law of war
War crimes
Criminal defenses
Military law
Nuremberg trials